Gonocerus insidiator is a species of squash bugs belonging to the family Coreidae.

Distribution and habitat
This holomediterranean species is mainly found in France, Italy, Greece, Portugal, Spain and former Jugoslavia. These squash bugs prefer riverine woods.

Description

These squash bugs have greenish protruding eyes and long reddish brown antennae composed with four segments. The pronotum is broad and bears two long sharp spikes. The basic color or the body is reddish brown, with a yellowish-green ventral side. The color of the legs may be yellowish-green or reddish-yellow.

The head is shorter than the pronotum. Corium shows small spots, but without extensive stains. Pronotum, at the humeral corners, is wider than the abdomen, including connexivi. Head is without black bands between the antennas and the rear edge.

This species can be distinguished from Gonocerus acuteangulatus  by the wider pronotum.

Biology
G. insidiator feed on sap from various host plants and fruits, especially on Pistacia lentiscus, Arbutus unedo and Cistus species. They overwinter in the adult stage.

References

Hemiptera of Europe
Gonocerini